This article lists the performance of Aris F.C. in the Greek national championship, the Greek cup and the various European competitions it has qualified per season.

Super League Greece

Before 1959 

Before 1959, Aris was competing in the Panhellenic Championship, the Greek National Football Championship format that was the predecessor of Alpha Ethniki. During this period, Aris managed to be crowned three times Greek Champion and numerous more regional Macedonian Champion

Regional Champion of Macedonian Football Clubs Association in 1923, 1924, 1926, 1928, 1929, 1930, 1931, 1934, 1938, 1946, 1949, 1953, 1959. 

Northern Greece Champion: 1933, 1935. 

Panhellenic Champion in 1928, 1932 and 1946.

Notes:

Since 1959 

From 1959 to 2014, Aris had been competing in the top-tier Alpha Ethniki of the Greek National Football Championship, with the interval of two seasons (1997–98 and 2005–06) that the club competed in the second-tier Beta Ethniki. During this period, the club had once been tied for the 1st place, in the 1979–80 season, ultimately losing the play-off match for 1st place to Olympiakos and had also reached the top 5 places many times. However, in 2014 it was relegated to third-tier Gamma Ethniki due to financial and management reasons. After spending two seasons in third-tier Gamma Ethniki and another two in second-tier Football League (Greece), Aris will compete in first-tier Super League Greece in season 2018–19.

Notes:

League top scorers

Most league appearances

Greek Cup 

Aris has been participating in the Greek Football Cup since its inception in the 1931–1932 season, having been 9 times in the cup final, winning it once in the 1969–70 season.

Notes:

European competitions 

Aris FC have played in the UEFA Cup and the UEFA Cup Winners' Cup on many occasions.
The furthest the club has progressed is to the third round of the 1979–80 UEFA Cup where Aris beat the Portuguese side Benfica 4–3 on aggregate in the 1st Round, and Italian club Perugia 4–1 on aggregate in the 2nd Round, before being eliminated 4–7 on aggregate by French club Saint Etienne. Aris's most recent participation in Europe is in the 2010–11 UEFA Europa League. The club's biggest win in a European competition was 6–0 to Hibernians, while the heaviest defeat was 1–9 to Újpest, both in 1968–69.

Aris boasts a remarkable statistic in European football; the club had not lost a home game in European competitions in 52 years (1968 το 2020), having gone 28 home games undefeated. This record was notably maintained when Aris defeated Europa League champions Atlético Madrid on 16 September 2010, Aris' 23rd undefeated home game in Europe. The team then went on to tie Bayer Leverkusen and Manchester City to keep the record intact once more. In 2020, Aris finally recorded a home loss to FC Kolos Kovalivka in a European qualification game.

European matches panorama 

Aris Thessaloniki F.C. scores are given first in all scorelines.

UEFA club ranking

UEFA club competition record 
After 2022 2nd qualifying round matches.

Honours 

Aris Thessaloniki's honours and achievements include the following:

Domestic

Domestic Championships

 Panhellenic Championship / Alpha Ethniki / Super League Greece (national level 1)
 Champions (3): 1927–28, 1931–32, 1945–46
 Runners-up (3): 1929–30, 1932–33, 1979–80
 Beta Ethniki / Football League (national level 2)
 Champions (1): 1997–98
 Runners-up (1): 2017–18
 Promotion (2): 1997–98 , 2005–06 , 2017–18 
 Gamma Ethniki / Football League 2 (national level 3)
 Champions (1): 2015–16
 Runners-up (1): 2014–15
 Promotion (1): 2015–16

Domestic Cups

 Greek Cup
 Winners (1): 1969–70
 Finalists (8): 1931–32, 1932–33, 1939–40, 1949–50, 2002–03, 2004–05, 2007–08, 2009–10
 Greek Amateurs' Cup
 Winners (1): 1984-85

International

 Greater Greece Cup
 Winners (1): 1971

Regional

 Macedonian Football Clubs Association Championship (local level 1 until 1959) 
 Winners (13): 1922–23, 1923–24, 1925–26, 1927–28, 1928–29, 1929–30, 1930–31, 1933–34, 1937–38, 1945–46, 1948–49, 1952–53, 1958–59
 Runners up (6): 1938–39, 1947–48, 1951–52, 1953–54, 1955–56, 1956–57
 Northern Greece Championship (regional level 1 in 1932–35, 1938–40) 
 Winners (2): 1932–33, 1934–35
 Runners up (2): 1933–34, 1938–39

Youth

 Greek Youth Football Championship (national level 1)
 Winners(11): 1962, 1963, 1964, 1971, 1975, 1978, 1983, 1984, 1985, 1987, 1991
 Super League U–20 Championship (national level 1)
 Winners (2): 2001–02, 2010–11
 Super League U-17 Championship (national level 1)
 Winners (1): 2011-12
 Finalists (1): 2021-22
 Football League U-19 Championship (national level 2)
 Winners (1): 2017-18
 Finalists (1): 2016-17

Notes:

References

 
Aris F.C. seasons